Acheilognathus rhombeus is a temperate freshwater fish belonging to the Acheilognathinae sub-family of the  family Cyprinidae.  It originates in Japan and the Korean Peninsula. It was originally described as Capoeta rhombea by Temminck & Schlegel in 1846.  It is the type species for the genus Acheilognathus.

When spawning, the females deposit their eggs inside bivalves, where they hatch and the young remain until they can swim.

References 
 

Acheilognathus
Fish described in 1846